George Theodore Caithamer (July 22, 1910 – June 1, 1954) was a Major League Baseball catcher.  He played in five games for the Chicago White Sox in 1934.  He recorded 6 hits and 0 home runs, but put up an impressive .316 batting average.  He died at age 43 in 1954.

External links
 Baseball Almanac
 Baseball Reference
 the Baseball Cube
 Sports Illustrated

Chicago White Sox players
1910 births
1954 deaths
Major League Baseball catchers
Baseball players from Chicago